The Taifa of Carmona was a medieval Berber taifa kingdom. It existed for two distinct periods: first from 1013 to 1066 when it was conquered by the Taifa of Seville, and secondly from around 1143 to 1150 when it was finally conquered by the Almohad Caliphate. The taifa was established and ruled by the Zenata Berber Birzalid dynasty.

Origins
The Banu Birzal was a Zenata Berber tribe  settled in the Zab region and belonging to the confederations of the central Maghreb (Maghreb al-Awsat).

List of emirs

Birzalid dynasty

'Abd Allah: 1013/4–1023/4
Muhammad: 1023/4–1042/3
Ishaq: 1042/3–1052/3
Al-'Aziz: 1052/3–1066/7
To Seville: 1066/7–1091
To Morocco: 1091-c. 1143

Darddusid dynasty
Darddus: fl. mid-12th century
To Morocco: 1150–1248

See also
 List of Sunni Muslim dynasties

References

Berber dynasties
1150 disestablishments
States and territories established in 1013
Carmona
Province of Seville